Joyland Park can mean:
 Joyland (Atlanta), a neighborhood of Atlanta, Georgia, site of Joyland amusement park
 Joyland Amusement Park (Wichita)